Mirabad (also Romanized as Mīrābād) is a village in Moshkabad Rural District, in the Central District of Arak County, Markazi Province, Iran. At the 2006 census, its population was 33, in 8 families.

References 

Populated places in Arak County